Qanat-e Seh (also Romanized as Qanāt-e Seh) is a village in Heruz Rural District, Kuhsaran District, Ravar County, Kerman Province, Iran. At the 2006 census, its population was 109, in 33 families.

References 

Populated places in Ravar County